Sealy is a city in Austin County in southeastern Texas, United States. The population was 6,839 at the 2020 census.

History
San Felipe, Texas, sold part of its original  township to the Gulf, Colorado and Santa Fe Railroad to create Sealy in 1879. Sealy gets its name after business tycoon and majority stock holder of the GCSF RR, George Sealy of Galveston. In 1881, Daniel Haynes, a cotton gin builder, filled a request for a cotton-filled mattress which started a company. He named this the Sealy Mattress Company after the town. Business grew exponentially, which led to more innovation and several patents, such as a machine that compressed cotton.

Geography

Demographics

As of the 2020 United States census, there were 6,839 people, 2,524 households, and 1,921 families residing in the city.

As of the census of 2000, there were 5,248 people, 1,882 households, and 1,349 families residing in the city. The population density was 759.3 people per square mile (293.2/km2). There were 2,077 housing units at an average density of 300.5 per square mile (116.1/km2). The racial makeup of the city was 75.1% White, 12.3% African American, 0.30% Native American, 0.55% Asian, 12.88% from other races, and 1.92% from two or more races. Hispanic or Latino of any race were 30.43% of the population.

There were 1,882 households, out of which 38.4% had children under the age of 18 living with them, 52.6% were married couples living together, 13.7% had a female householder with no husband present, and 28.3% were non-families. 24.5% of all households were made up of individuals, and 11.7% had someone living alone who was 65 years of age or older. The average household size was 2.75 and the average family size was 3.30.

In the city, the population was spread out, with 30.2% under the age of 18, 9.3% from 18 to 24, 28.9% from 25 to 44, 19.2% from 45 to 64, and 12.5% who were 65 years of age or older. The median age was 33 years. For every 100 females, there were 91.3 males. For every 100 females age 18 and over, there were 87.8 males.

The median income for a household in the city was $34,277, and the median income for a family was $40,348. Males had a median income of $28,720 versus $20,793 for females. The per capita income for the city was $15,986. About 11.2% of families and 15.6% of the population were below the poverty line, including 18.9% of those under age 18 and 13.5% of those age 65 or over.

Education

People who live in Sealy are zoned to schools in Sealy Independent School District. The schools in Sealy ISD are Selman Elementary School or Sealy Elementary (pre-kindergarten to third grade), Selman Intermediate School (4–5), Sealy Junior High School (6–8), and Sealy High School (9–12). All of the schools are in Sealy. Blinn College has a Sealy Campus located along Interstate 10 east of State Highway 36.

Infrastructure

Transportation
Sealy is served by Interstate 10, U.S. Highway 90, Texas State Highway 36, the BNSF Railway, and the Union Pacific Railroad. The Greyhound Bus Lines operates the Sealy Station at Mazac Muffler City AC.

Notable people
 Eric Dickerson, Pro Football Hall of Fame running back
 Ernie Koy, Major League Baseball player
 Huey Long, singer with The Ink Spots
 Ricky Seals-Jones, current NFL tight end for the Washington Commanders
 George Sealy, Business man; origin of the city name

Notes

References

External links

 City of Sealy official website
 Sealy Chamber of Commerce

Cities in Austin County, Texas
Cities in Texas
Greater Houston